Robert Lewis Thomson (born August 16, 1963) is a Canadian professional baseball manager for the Philadelphia Phillies of Major League Baseball.

During Thomson’s playing career, he was a catcher and third baseman in the Detroit Tigers organization from 1985 to 1988. Following his years as a player, Thomson spent one year as the manager of the Class A Oneonta Yankees, and several more years in various front office capacities for the New York Yankees including as Major League Field Coordinator. He then served as the Yankees’ bench coach in 2008, third base coach from 2009 to 2014, and bench coach again from 2015 to 2017. 

In 2018, Thomson was named as the bench coach of the Philadelphia Phillies. On June 3, 2022, Thomson was named interim manager of the Philadelphia Phillies following the firing of manager Joe Girardi. After leading the Phillies to their first playoff series win since 2010, Thomson was named the full-time manager on October 10, 2022. That year, he went on to lead the Phillies to their first National League pennant since 2009.

Early life
Thomson was born on August 16, 1963 in Sarnia, Ontario and grew up in nearby Corunna, Ontario. He grew up playing baseball in the summers and hockey in the winter. Thomson has a younger sister and two older brothers, one of whom signed with the Montreal Expos.

Playing career

College career
Thomson was a standout for the Stratford Nationals of the Intercounty Baseball League. From there, he was recruited to St. Clair County Community College where he played baseball for one year. After a year, he transferred to the University of Kansas. Thomson led the Jayhawks in hits in 1984 and 1985 and holds the school record for the highest single-season batting average.

Detroit Tigers

Thomson was selected by the Detroit Tigers in the 32nd round of the 1985 Major League Baseball draft from the University of Kansas. He played catcher and third base in the Tigers' minor league system until 1988, reaching as high as Class A. In 661 at bats, he hit .225/.312/.304 with seven home runs and three steals. He played 136 games at catcher, 55 games at third base, and pitched in one game.

International career
Thomson represented Canada in baseball, which was a demonstration sport, in the 1984 Summer Olympics in Los Angeles.

Coaching and front office career

Detroit Tigers (1988–1989)
From 1988 to 1990, Thomson served as a minor league coach in the Detroit Tigers organization. Thomson says he got into coaching because "I wasn’t a good enough player. The game sort of forced me into coaching. I was lucky enough the Tigers thought enough of me as an evaluator, teacher and an organizer to offer me a coaching position."

New York Yankees (1990–2017)

In 1990, Thomson joined the New York Yankees organization as a third base coach for the team's Class-A affiliate in Fort Lauderdale. He moved into the front office in 1998 as a Field Coordinator, and became Director of Player Development in 2000. Prior to the 2003 season, he was named Vice President of Minor League Development, and he was named to the Yankees major league coaching staff in November of the same year. Thomson ran the Yankees’ spring training camp. Yankees manager Joe Torre nicknamed Thomson "Topper" because Thomson was always on top of everything while running the spring training camp.

During the 1994–95 offseason, he managed the Canberra Bushrangers of the original Australian Baseball League.

On September 27, 2006, Thomson took over as first base coach of the Yankees in place of Tony Peña, who had learned before the game that his father had died. He filled in at the position for four games, and Peña returned in time for the season finale on October 1.

Prior to the 2008 season, incoming manager Joe Girardi named Thomson his bench coach. On April 4, 2008, Girardi fell ill with a respiratory infection and designated Thomson to manage that night's game against the Tampa Bay Rays. It was Thomson's first major league game as a manager, and he became the first Canadian to manage a Major League game since George Gibson for the Pittsburgh Pirates in 1934; the Yankees lost 13–4. Thomson also managed the April 5 game due to Girardi's illness. 

He served as the team's third base coach for six seasons, and was a member of the coaching staff for the Yankees' 2009 World Series championship. Prior to the 2015 season, Thomson was named bench coach, which was a role he held until 2017.

Philadelphia Phillies (2018–present)

Thomson held the position of Philadelphia Phillies bench coach from 2018–2022. He initially got the assignment under first year manager Gabe Kapler. A report by Jon Heyman claimed that after a series of managing mistakes by Kapler, Thomson had taken over in-game decisions. Kapler was fired after two seasons, but Thomson remained the Phillies’ bench coach under new manager Joe Girardi, who had worked with Thomson while with the Yankees. Prior to the 2022 season, Thomson had stated to the team that it would be his last as a bench coach, intending to retire after the completion of the season.

On June 3, 2022, the Phillies fired manager Joe Girardi after a disappointing 22–29 start to the season. The same day, Thomson was named the Phillies’ interim manager. Thomson became the first Canadian full-time manager since George Gibson managed the Pittsburgh Pirates in 1934. The Phillies won their first game under Thomson, blanking the Los Angeles Angels 10–0.

On July 13, 2022, Thomson managed a game against the Toronto Blue Jays, at the Rogers Centre, to become the first Canadian to manage a major league game in Canada.

The Phillies secured a 3-0 win over the Houston Astros to clinch their first playoff berth since 2011 on October 3, 2022. After the game, Thomson said in the locker room "We’re not done. After Wednesday, we have 13 more wins and [then] we’re world champions." With the Phillies making the playoffs, Thomson became just the fourth interim manager in MLB history to take over a team at least 7 games under .500 and lead them to the postseason. In the Wild Card Series, against the St. Louis Cardinals, the Phillies swept the Cardinals 2-0 for their first playoff series win since 2010. In the National League Division Series, the Phillies faced off against the defending World Series champion Atlanta Braves. The Phillies defeated the Braves, 3-1, and reached the National League Championship Series for the first time since 2010.

On October 10, 2022, the Phillies removed the interim tag from Thomson's title and formally named him the 55th manager in franchise history, with a two-year contract.
He then led the team to win the 2022 National League Pennant. After clinching a trip to the 2022 World Series, Thomson reiterated that there was more work to be done telling his team that they had "beaten three really good teams, and there was one to go." The Phillies lost to the Houston Astros in six games, where the Astros won three in a row after losing two of the first three games. In Game 6, Thomson received scrutiny from some in the media for his decision to take out starter Zach Wheeler after 70 pitches that saw José Alvarado promptly give up a home run to Yordan Alvarez for the go-ahead runs.

Managerial record

Personal life
Thomson lives in Stratford, Ontario, a 1 hour 45-minute drive from Toronto, with his wife, Michele. In the past, Thomson lived in Tampa Bay, Florida and Manhattan, New York. He has two daughters.

References

External links

Rob Thomson at SABR (Baseball BioProject)
Rob Thomson Philadelphia Phillies bio

1963 births
Living people
Baseball people from Ontario
Baseball players at the 1984 Summer Olympics
Bristol Tigers players
Canadian baseball coaches
Canadian expatriate baseball players in the United States
Gastonia Jets players
Gastonia Tigers players
Kansas Jayhawks baseball players
Lakeland Tigers players
Major League Baseball bench coaches
Major League Baseball third base coaches
New York Yankees coaches
New York Yankees executives
Olympic baseball players of Canada
Philadelphia Phillies coaches
Sportspeople from Sarnia
Canadian Baseball Hall of Fame inductees
Canadian expatriate baseball people in Australia
Philadelphia Phillies managers
Minor league baseball managers